Helios, also known as 2nd & Pine, is a residential skyscraper in downtown Seattle, Washington. Plans for the project were first proposed in 2013 and construction began in late 2014. It is located at the intersection of 2nd Avenue and Pine Street near the Pike Place Market and the city's retail core.

Architects Weber Thompson and GBD Architects, working on the project in a joint venture, described the tower's design as "slender and sculpted". It sits atop a podium, housing  of retail space, with a terra-cotta facade. The building also includes Zipcar parking spaces, electric vehicle charging stations, bicycle parking, low-energy appliances, and other environmentally-friendly features in a bid to earn a LEED rating.

The five-story, 217-stall underground parking garage extends north from the tower's lot to a site that will be occupied by a 16-story hotel developed by Widewaters Group.

History

The site at 2nd Avenue and Pine Street was originally proposed for a  residential tower developed by Paul Brenneke and planned to break ground in 2006. Plans were scrapped after a new downtown zoning ordinance was approved in 2006, and a new, 23-story, $200 million mixed-use highrise named "1 Hotel & Residences" was proposed by Brenneke and Starwood Capital Group. The proposed building would have 98 luxury condominiums and a 110-room hotel as well as four floors of retail at ground level and a luxury gym. The project broke ground in 2007 and was expected to be completed in 2009, but construction was halted in September 2007 because of the then-ongoing financial crisis, and designs were revised to eliminate over 100 proposed condominium units after only 20 of them had been sold. Brenneke sold his stake in the project to Starwood in June 2008, citing the project's financial difficulties. The excavated hole was later filled in 2009 and paved over with a parking lot.

The half-block property was bought by Chicago-based Equity Residential in 2012 for $22 million, and the company announced its plans for a 39-story apartment building in January 2013. Construction of the building, led by Turner Construction, began in October 2014 and was completed in 2017.

A 16-story, 229-room hotel on the north side of the lot, facing Stewart Street, began construction in 2016 and is scheduled to be completed in February 2018.

References

External links
Equity Apartments
Construction camera via Turner Construction
Weber Thompson profile
GBD Architects profile

Residential skyscrapers in Seattle
Residential buildings completed in 2017
2017 establishments in Washington (state)